The Houston Cougars men's basketball team represents the University of Houston in Houston, Texas, in the NCAA Division I men's basketball competition. The university is a member of the American Athletic Conference. The program has made six appearances in the NCAA Division I men's basketball tournament Final Four, which is tied for 10th most all-time, along with the most for any team who has not won a national championship.

History

Early history (1945–56)
Although the University of Houston already had a women's basketball program, the Houston Cougars men's basketball program did not begin until the 1945–46 season. Alden Pasche was the team's first head coach. In their first two seasons, the Cougars won Lone Star Conference regular-season titles and qualified for postseason play in the NAIA Men's Basketball tournaments in 1946 and 1947. The Cougars had an all-time NAIA tournament record of 2–2 in two years.

During Pasche's tenure, the Cougars posted a 135–116 record. Under his leadership in 1949, the Cougars won the Gulf Coast Conference championship. College Basketball Hall of famer coach Guy V. Lewis played for Pasche, and eventually became an assistant coach before being handed the job upon Pasche's retirement.

Guy Lewis era (1956–86)

Pasche retired after the 1955–56 season, and Houston assistant Guy Lewis was promoted to the head coaching position. Lewis, a former Cougar player, led Houston to 27 straight winning seasons and 14 seasons with 20 or more wins, including 14 trips to the NCAA tournament. His Houston teams made the Final Four on five occasions (1967, 1968, 1982–84) and twice advanced to the NCAA Championship Game (1983, 1984). Among the outstanding players who Lewis coached are Elvin Hayes, Hakeem Olajuwon, Clyde Drexler, Otis Birdsong, Dwight Jones, Don Chaney and "Sweet" Lou Dunbar.

Lewis's UH teams twice played key roles in high-profile events that helped to popularize college basketball as a spectator sport. In 1968, his underdog, Elvin Hayes-led Cougars upset the undefeated and top-ranked UCLA Bruins in front of more than 50,000 fans at Houston's Astrodome. The game became known as the “Game of the Century” and marked a watershed in the popularity of college basketball. In the early 1980s, Lewis's Phi Slama Jama teams at UH gained notoriety for their fast-breaking, "above the rim" style of play as well as their overall success. These teams attracted great public interest with their entertaining style of play. At the height of Phi Slama Jama's notoriety, they suffered a dramatic, last-second loss in the 1983 NCAA Final that set a then-ratings record for college basketball broadcasts and became an iconic moment in the history of the sport. Lewis's insistence that these highly successful teams play an acrobatic, up-tempo brand of basketball that emphasized dunking brought this style of play to the fore and helped popularize it amongst younger players.

Houston lost in both NCAA Final games in which Lewis coached, despite his "Phi Slama Jama" teams featuring superstars Clyde Drexler and Hakeem Olajuwon. In 1983, Houston lost in a dramatic title game to the North Carolina State Wolfpack on a last-second dunk by Lorenzo Charles. The Cougars lost in the 1984 NCAA Final to the Georgetown Hoyas, led by Patrick Ewing. Lewis retired from coaching in 1986 at number 20 in all-time NCAA Division I victories, his 592–279 record giving him a .680 career winning percentage.

As a coach, Lewis was known for championing the once-outlawed dunk, which he characterized as a "high percentage shot", and for clutching a brightly colored red-and-white polka dot towel on the bench during games. Lewis was a major force in the racial integration of college athletics in the South during the 1960s, being one of the first major college coaches in the region to actively recruit African-American athletes. His recruitment of Elvin Hayes and Don Chaney in 1964 ushered in an era of tremendous success in Cougar basketball. The dominant play of Hayes led the Cougars to two Final Fours and sent shock waves through Southern colleges that realized that they would have to begin recruiting black players if they wanted to compete with integrated teams.

Welcome to Conference USA (1996–2004)
After 21 years in the Southwest Conference, the Cougars joined Conference USA in 1996. Under head coach Alvin Brooks, the basketball program had a disappointing initial season in C-USA. The team went 3–11 against C-USA teams in 1996–97. The next season was even more futile. Brooks, who had led the Cougars since 1993, coached the Cougars to a rock bottom conference record of 2–14 in 1997–98. The last, and only other, time the Cougars recorded only two conference victories in a season was in 1950–51; their first season in the Missouri Valley Conference.

One of Houston's biggest sports icons and one of the Cougars best basketball players ever, Clyde Drexler was hired to coach the program that he led as a player to the 1983 NCAA Final as part of Phi Slama Jama. Basketball excitement was back on campus, and fans looked forward to the promising years to come. After just two seasons with minimal success, Drexler resigned as head coach citing his intention to spend more time with his family.

Ray McCallum was hired to do what Clyde Drexler could not—lead the Cougars to a winning season and earn a spot in the NCAA tournament. After losing seasons in each of his first two years, McCallum guided the Cougars to an 18–15 record in 2001–02. That season, the team won two conference tournament games and qualified for the National Invitation Tournament. However, the team regressed in the following season and failed to qualify for even their own C-USA tournament.

Two steps forward, one step back (2004–07)
Tom Penders was named as the head coach of Cougars basketball in 2004. Known as "Turnaround Tom" for his reputation of inheriting sub-par basketball programs and making them better, Penders was hired to rebuild a program that recorded only one winning season in its last eight years. After a surprising debut season in 2004–05 that led to an NIT appearance, the team had high hopes to build on their relative success and make the NCAA tournament in 2006.

The 2005–06 season looked promising at the outset. The Cougars started their first game on a 30–0 scoring run against the Florida Tech Panthers. Less than two weeks later, the Cougars beat the nationally ranked LSU Tigers on the road and the Arizona Wildcats at home. The surprising wins earned the Cougars their first national ranking in several years. The team that seemed destined for an NCAA Tournament berth failed to capitalize on their success and national recognition and began to stumble after a loss to South Alabama Jaguars in December. The Cougars won only one conference tournament game and had to settle again for another NIT bid.

Dubbed as "The Show," the 2006–07 Cougars entered the season with cockiness and strong expectations to finally make it into the NCAA tournament. A difficult schedule matched the Cougars with seven different teams that would end up qualifying for either the 2007 NCAA Tournament or NIT. Houston lost three times to the Memphis Tigers and once each to Arizona, the Creighton Bluejays, the Kentucky Wildcats, South Alabama, the UNLV Runnin' Rebels, and the VCU Rams. By going 0–9 against these quality teams, the Cougars proved they were not worthy of an at-large bid to the NCAA tournament. Not surprisingly, two conference tournament wins against lower seeds and an unimpressive 18–15 overall record were not even enough to earn the team an invitation to the NIT.

Team goal: NCAA Tournament (2007–10)

In 2007–08 the team introduced a new nickname ("The Show—In 3D") and a slightly new uniform (a changed trim design). The team hoped to reach the NCAA tournament for the first time since 1992. Eight straight home games from November 21 to December 29 helped the Cougars get off to an 11–1 start. However, the team lost most of its critical games at the end of the season, including their last two games (both against the UTEP Miners). Houston received an invitation to the inaugural College Basketball Invitational tournament and defeated the Nevada Wolf Pack and the Valparaiso Crusaders but lost to their conference rival, the Tulsa Golden Hurricane, in the semifinal round.

The 2008–09 season began on November 11 with a two-point loss to the Georgia Southern Eagles; this was the first game of the Division I college basketball season and the opening game of the 2K Sports Classic tournament in Durham, North Carolina. A Cougars win would have meant a second round matchup with the Duke Blue Devils. Overall, the Cougars played a balanced home and away regular season schedule. Fifteen games (three in November, three in December, four in January, three in February, and two in March) were played at Hofheinz Pavilion. There were 14 away games (two in November, two in December, five in January, and five in February).

The 2009–10 team finished the regular season 15–15 and 7–9 in C-USA, finishing seventh place in the conference. Following a 93–80 win over East Carolina in the first round of the C–USA Tournament, the Cougars beat Memphis 66–65, ending a string of four tournament titles for the Tigers. In the next game, they defeated Southern Miss 74–66 to advance to the championship game. Finally, the Cougars beat #25 ranked UTEP 81–73 to earn the conference's bid to the NCAA tournament, their first since 1992. In the first round of the NCAA tournament, Houston, seeded 13th, was defeated 89–77 by 4th-seeded Maryland.

Penders announced his resignation as Houston head coach on March 22, 2010.

The school hired James Dickey on March 21, 2010.

Joining The American (2013–23)
Beginning with the 2013–14 season, Houston joined the newly created American Athletic Conference following the Big East realignment.

In March 2014, Dickey stepped down as head coach because of "private family matters". In four seasons with Houston, Dickey amassed a 64–62 record with no NCAA Tournament appearances or conference titles.

On April 3, 2014, Houston hired Kelvin Sampson as the new Cougars head coach. Sampson had just become eligible to be a college coach again after receiving a five-year show cause penalty in 2008 for sanctions against him during his time as Indiana head coach. In 2014–15, Sampson's first season, Houston struggled again, finishing with a 13–19 record and 4–14 in the AAC.

The 2015–16 team led a resurgence, finishing 22–10 overall, 12–6 in conference, but lost in the AAC tournament and in the first round of the NIT.

In 2017–18, the Cougars compiled a 27–8 overall record, reaching the finals of the AAC tournament and winning a game in the NCAA tournament for the first time since 1984.

In 2018–19, the Cougars' success continued as they set a program record for wins with a 33–4 mark. They were AAC regular-season champions but fell in the finals of the conference tournament. They proceeded to the NCAA tournament, where they reached the Sweet Sixteen for the first time in 35 years.

In 2020–21, the Cougars were ranked as high as No. 5 in the nation. After winning the AAC Tournament, the Cougars were awarded a #2 seed in the NCAA Tournament. UH defeated Cleveland State, Rutgers, Syracuse and Oregon State to achieve their first Final Four appearance since 1984. They would lose to eventual national champions Baylor in the Final Four.

During the 2021–22 season, the Cougars won the AAC regular season championship with a 15–3 conference record. They then defeated Cincinnati, Tulane and Memphis to win the conference tournament. With the conference championship, an overall record of 29–5 and ranked No. 15 in the nation, Houston received a #5 seed in the NCAA tournament. In the tournament, UH defeated UAB, Illinois and Arizona before losing to Villanova in the Elite Eight. Going into the 2022–2023 season, UH has a 108–53 regular season conference record along with having won or shared the AAC regular season title in three of the last four seasons, and have finished no worse than third since the 2014–15 season.

Hello Big 12
In September 2021, the University of Houston was invited to join the Big 12 Conference, along with Cincinnati, UCF and BYU. The Cougars will begin Big 12 play in the 2023–24 season.

Conference affiliations
 Lone Star Conference (1945–1949)
 Gulf Coast Conference (1949–1950)
 Missouri Valley Conference (1950–1960)
 Independent (1960–1975)
 Southwest Conference (1975–1996)
 Conference USA (1996–2013)
 American Athletic Conference (2013–2023)
 Big 12 Conference (2023–onward)

Head-to-head American Athletic Conference records since 1949–50
Note: Through 3/12/23.
Source: Houston Cougars Head-to-Head Results

Italics indicate school no longer sponsors men's basketball in The American.

Championships

Conference Regular Season championships
The Cougars have won 11 conference regular season championships in their history, nine of which were outright championships. From 1960 to 1975, the Cougars were not eligible for a conference championship as they were not affiliated with any conference.

† co-champions

Conference Tournament Finals appearances
Houston has appeared in 16 conference tournament finals in their history, winning 8 of them.

Top 25 finishes
The Houston Cougars have finished in the AP Poll and/or the Coaches Poll 15 times in the program's history.

Rivalries

Rice

Houston leads Rice in the series 65–18 through the 2021–22 season.

SMU

Houston leads SMU in the series 58–34 through the 2022–23 season.

Recent records

* Overall record includes regular season and tournament/postseason results; regular season conference record in parentheses

** The 2020 American Conference and NCAA Tournaments were cancelled due to concerns with COVID-19.

Head coaches

Note: Through 2021–22 season.

Postseason play

NCAA Men's Division I Tournament results
The Cougars have appeared in 23 NCAA Tournaments. Their combined record is 36–28.

The NCAA began seeding the tournament with the 1978 edition.

NIT results
The Cougars have appeared in 11 National Invitation Tournaments (NIT). Their combined record is 5–11.

CBI
The Cougars have appeared in the College Basketball Invitational (CBI) three times. Their combined record is 3–3.

NAIA tournament results
The Cougars have appeared in the NAIA tournament twice. Their combined record is 2–2.

Notable players

† Played in the NBA (current players in bold)

‡ Played in the ABA

Houston Cougars in the NBA draft
Houston has had 45 players selected in the NBA draft.

Individual Awards

National Coach of the Year award winners

Associated Press College Basketball Coach of the Year
 Guy Lewis – 1968 & 1983

Henry Iba Award
 Guy Lewis – 1968

NABC Coach of the Year
 Guy Lewis – 1968

Sporting News Men's College Basketball Coach of the Year Award
 Guy Lewis – 1968

UPI College Basketball Coach of the Year
 Guy Lewis – 1968

John McLendon Award
 Kelvin Sampson – 2021

Ben Jobe Award
 Kelvin Sampson – 2022
|}

National Player of the Year award winners

Associated Press College Basketball Player of the Year
 Elvin Hayes – 1968

Basketball Times Player of the Year
 Akeem Olajuwon – 1984

Helms Foundation College Basketball Player of the Year
 Akeem Olajuwon – 1983

NCAA basketball tournament Most Outstanding Player
 Akeem Olajuwon – 1983

Sporting News Men's College Basketball Player of the Year
 Elvin Hayes – 1968

UPI College Basketball Player of the Year
 Elvin Hayes – 1968
|}

All-Americans

Houston has had 23 players receive All-American honors while at UH.

Key

Note: HM stands for Honorable Mention.

Conference Player of the Year
The following Houston players have been named Conference Player of the Year while at UH.

† co-Player of the Year

Conference Coach of the Year
The following Houston coaches have been named Conference Coach of the Year while at UH.

Individual Honors

Naismith Memorial Basketball Hall of Fame inductees
The following Houston players and coaches have been enshrined in the Naismith Memorial Basketball Hall of Fame.

Retired numbers

The Cougars have retired the numbers of five men's basketball players:

See also
 Game of the Century
 Guy Lewis
 Phi Slama Jama

References

External links

 

 
Basketball teams established in 1945